The three-point turn (sometimes called a Y-turn, K-turn, or broken U-turn) is the standard method of turning a vehicle around to face the opposite direction in a limited space, using forward and reverse gears. This is typically done when the road is too narrow for a U-turn.

This manoeuvre is a common requirement in driving tests.

Process
The basic manoeuvre consists of driving across the road turning towards the offside curb, reversing across the road to the original nearside curb while turning, and driving forward towards the original offside curb, now the nearside. In a narrow road or with a longer vehicle, more than three legs may be required to achieve a full 180 degree rotation.

Naming
"Three point turn" is the formal name in Australia, Canada, New Zealand, and in many regions of the United States. Less common terms are: "Y-turn", "K-turn", and Broken U-turn but in the UK, the official name is "Turning in the road (using forward and reverse gears)", and in Ireland it is called a "turnabout", because an acceptable turn may include more than three points.

Notes

References

Further reading 
 

Driving techniques